Conus delanoyae, common name Delanoy's cone, is a species of sea snail, a marine gastropod mollusk in the family Conidae, the cone snails and their allies.

Like all species within the genus Conus, these snails are predatory and venomous. They are capable of "stinging" humans, therefore live ones should be handled carefully or not at all.

Description

Length: 17–35 mm.

Distribution
This species occur off the Atlantic island off Boa Vista, Cape Verde.

References

 Tucker J.K. & Tenorio M.J. (2009) Systematic classification of Recent and fossil conoidean gastropods. Hackenheim: Conchbooks. 296 pp.
  Puillandre N., Duda T.F., Meyer C., Olivera B.M. & Bouchet P. (2015). One, four or 100 genera? A new classification of the cone snails. Journal of Molluscan Studies. 81: 1–23

External links
 The Conus Biodiversity website
 Cone Shells – Knights of the Sea

delanoyae
Gastropods described in 1979
Fauna of Boa Vista, Cape Verde
Gastropods of Cape Verde
Endemic fauna of Cape Verde